Atara ( Atâra) is a Palestinian village in the Ramallah and al-Bireh Governorate, located 15 kilometers north of Ramallah in the central West Bank. A village of nearly 2,300 inhabitants, it is situated along a mountain ridge line with four peaks and is built upon the second highest point in the West Bank at 810 meters above sea level. 'Atara's total land area consists of 9,545 dunams, most of which is cultivable.

Location
It is bordered by  Silwad  to the east, 'Abwein  to the north, Burham, 'Ajjul and Umm Safa to the west, and Bir Zeit  to the south.

History 
Sherds from the  Iron Age I, Iron Age II,  Persian, Hellenistic, Roman,  Byzantine  and  Mamluk eras have been found.
Edward Robinson identified 'Atara with the Biblical Ataroth mentioned in the Book of Joshua 16:2. However, some modern authorities prefer to place Ataroth elsewhere.

Ottoman era
In 1517, the village was incorporated into the Ottoman Empire with the rest of Palestine. In 1596 it appeared in the  tax registers as being in the Nahiya of Quds of the Liwa of Quds.  It had a population of 55 Muslim households who paid a fixed tax rate of 33.3% on various agricultural products, including  wheat, barley, olives, vineyards or fruit trees, and goats or beehives; a total of 4,300 Akçe.

In the 17th-19th centuries, 'Atara was located in the nahiya of Bani Zeid. Adult males were required to pay 58-60 akçe to the Ottoman government in Jerusalem. It was also noted as a Muslim village.

The French explorer Victor Guérin  passed by the village in 1870,  and estimated it to have about  300 inhabitants.  An official Ottoman village list from about the same time (1870) showed that 'Atara had a total of 80 houses and a population of 225, though the population count included men only.  In 1882, the PEF's Survey of Western Palestine described Attara as a large village, seemingly ancient, in a conspicuous position on a hill, with olives round it.

In 1896 the population of  Atara was estimated to be about 480 persons.

British Mandate of Palestine
At the time of the 1922 census of Palestine, Atara had a population of 407 Muslims, increasing in the 1931 census to 559 Muslims in 133  houses.  In 1922, the Jewish National Fund established a moshav on 500 dunams of land.  Known as Ataroth, it was one of the first Zionist hill settlements.

In the 1945 statistics the population of  'Atara was 690 Muslims, while the total land area was 9,545 dunams, according to an official land and population survey. Of this,  3,524 were allocated for plantations and irrigable land, 3,550 for cereals, while 45 dunams were classified as built-up areas.

Jordanian era
In the wake of the 1948 Arab–Israeli War, and after the 1949 Armistice Agreements, 'Atara came  under Jordanian rule.

The Jordanian census of 1961 found 1,110 inhabitants.

Post-1967
Since the Six-Day War in 1967, 'Atara has been under Israeli occupation.  The population in the 1967 census conducted by the Israeli authorities was 903, of whom 61  originated from the Israeli territory.

After  the 1995 accords, 40.8% of village land has been defined as Area A land, 43.8%  as Area B, while the remaining 15.4% is Area C. Israel has confiscated a total of  163 dunams of land from the village in order to construct the Israeli settlement of Ateret.

In 2002, 95-year-old Atara resident Fatima Hassan became the oldest Palestinian fatality in the Second Intifada when the taxi she was in was shot at by Israeli soldiers. Witnesses said the car was waiting in a long line of cars and soldiers smashed the windows before firing.  An Israeli military source said soldiers fired at the taxi after it ignored orders to halt on a prohibited road.

Sanctuaries 
'Atara contains two sanctuaries for saintly figures. The village's old mosque encases the Sanctuary of I'mar. There used to stand a Byzantine church.

Sanctuary of Sheikh al-Qatrawani 
On the Dahrat Hamoud hill about 1.5 km south-west of 'Atara, standing at about 820 meters above sea level, lies the Maqam (shrine) of Sheikh al-Qatrawani. The shrine is one of a series of watchtowers overlooking the coast built by the Mamluks in the 16th century. The sanctuary, built atop the ruins of an ancient Byzantine monastery, is visited by Palestinian Muslims to offer vows and Christians to rest in or near. The present sanctuary is made up of the shrine, the remains of the monastery, a cave and a cistern.

According to local Islamic tradition, the sanctuary was named after a holy man named Sheikh Ahmad al-Qatrawani from the destroyed village of Qatra north of Gaza. Popular belief suggests that al-Qatrawani left his home town of Qatra due to his inability to fulfill his religious duties there, thus relocating to the deserted hill of Dar Hamouda where he "lived in prayer and self-mortification". Another popular tale claims when al-Qatrawani died, his dead body descended onto the hilltop where his sanctuary stands.

According to local legend from the town of Bir Zeit, nearby villagers found a Sufi derwish laying on the site and when asked of his origins, he said he was from Qatra and that angels brought him to the site where he would die. The residents of 'Atara, as well as nearby Ajjul and Silwad provided him with food and protection for four years and when they found him dead, they buried him just west of the sanctuary.

Many Palestinian Christians argue, however, that the site was dedicated to Saint Catherine, suggesting the etymological origin of "Qatrawani" to be from "Catherine". Hamdan Taha points out similarities between the Muslim tradition of al-Qatrawani descending to his burial place at the time of his death to the Christian tradition of Saint Catherine descending to Mount Sinai at the time of her death.

The modern building is a renovated version of the original building built in the late Mamluk era in the 16th century. The renovation took place in 1999 undertaken by the Palestinian Department of Antiquities. The sanctuary is a rectangular building 9.8 meters in width, and 5.9 meters in length. It has two semi-spherical domes, measuring 3.8 and 3.9 meters in diameter respectively. The eastern dome is built of finely cut stones, while the western dome is built of small rough field-stones, but both kinds are of local origin. The northern wall is 85 centimeters thick and is constructed of small stones, mortar and rubble. The eastern room of the sanctuary contains a mihrab ("prayer niche") with the typical orientation to Mecca as required in Islamic doctrine.

The cistern, currently blocked, is in front of the shrine and most likely collected rainwater in the past for the sanctuary. It possibly also drew water from the nearby spring of Wadi as-Saqi, located two kilometers south of the site. To the west of the Sheikh al-Qatrawani sanctuary is a winepress cut through stone. Its basin is 1.8 meters deep and is coated with a layer of white plaster. A stone-cut cave is located in front of the shrine, but was blocked in 1984 by the residents of 'Atara for "safety reasons". In front of the building is a courtyard and the actual tomb of Sheikh al-Qatrawnani is located adjacently west of the site and has been plundered a number of times.

Sherds from the  Byzantine, Crusader/Ayyubid and  Mamluk eras have been found here.

Demographics 
Emigration surged between 1952 and 1955 to the Gulf Arab states, due to poor economic conditions in the West Bank. Several others moved to Ramallah and Jerusalem for work. By 1961, the population was 1,110, however, it decreased tremendously after the 1967 Six-Day War, in which Israel captured and occupied the West Bank from Jordan. The village population slowly grew to 903 in 1982, then 976 in 1987.

In the first census taken by the Palestinian Central Bureau of Statistics (PCBS) in 1997, 'Atara's population reached 1,661, of which 92 were Palestinian refugees (5.6%). The gender make-up was 50.2% male and 49.8% female. According to a PCBS estimate, 'Atara had a population of approximately 2,400 inhabitants in mid-year 2006. In the PCBS census in 2007, 'Atara had a population of 2,270, of which 1,139 were males and 1,131 females. There 495 housing units and the average household size consisted of 5.5 family members.

Economy 
Until the early 1950s, 'Atara's inhabitants were dependent on agriculture as a main source of income. After 1967, many inhabitants began to work in Israel. As a result, agricultural production has been further reduced and a substantial portion of 'Atara's economy became dependent residents working abroad. Transportation is an issue in the village, with only one road being able to access through Bir Zeit.

Eggs are a primary agricultural product and there are eleven egg farms in the village. Olives are also widely produced and are delivered to an oil pressing factory in the town of 'Arura, where olive oil is produced. Israeli checkpoints around 'Atara, as well as the harvest of 'Atara's olive crop by Israeli settlers from Ateret has effectively strained the village's economy.

40.8% of  village land is defined as Area A land, 43.8%  as Area B, while the remaining 15.4% is defined as Area C. Israel has confiscated 163 dunums of the village land in order to construct the Israeli settlement of Ateret.

References

Bibliography 

 
  (p.  269) 
  
 

 
  

  
 (Cited in Hamdan Taha)

External links
Welcome To 'Atara
Atara, Welcome to Palestine
Survey of Western Palestine, Map 14:     IAA, Wikimedia commons
   Atara factsheet,  Applied Research Institute–Jerusalem (ARIJ)
Atara Village profile, ARIJ
 Atara aerial photo, ARIJ
 Locality Development Priorities and Needs in 'Atara Town, ARIJ

Ramallah and al-Bireh Governorate
Villages in the West Bank
Municipalities of the State of Palestine